Clewiston is a city in Hendry County, Florida, United States. The population was 7,327 at the 2020 census, up from 7,155 at the 2010 census. The estimated population in 2018 was 7,985. The city is located on the south bank of Lake Okeechobee, and the Lake Okeechobee Scenic Trail (LOST) passes through the edge of the city. The city is home to Billie Swamp Safari, the Clewiston Museum and the Dixie Crystal Theatre.

History

The area beside Lake Okeechobee was once used as a fishing camp by the Seminole tribe. The first permanent settlement began in 1920, when John O'Brien of Philadelphia and Alonzo Clewis of Tampa purchased a large tract of land to establish a town. They commissioned a town plan and built the Moore Haven & Clewiston Railway to connect the community to the Atlantic Coast Line Railroad at Moore Haven. Incorporated as a city in 1925, Clewiston would become noted for its sport fishing, particularly of largemouth bass.

Large sugar plantations were established around Lake Okeechobee. By the 1950s and 1960s, the cultivation of citrus, vegetables and cattle were also important to the economy. The US Sugar Corporation, however, remained the dominant manufacturer in Clewiston, which became known as "America's Sweetest Town". On June 24, 2008, Governor Charlie Crist announced that the state of Florida had arranged to buy for $1.75 billion the company's , including the refinery in Clewiston. This would allow the company to remain in business and leave open the possibility of preserving its 1,700 jobs. Over the next seven crop cycles, the farmland would be leased back from the state to US Sugar for $60 million. It would then be converted into reservoirs and water-filtering areas as part of the ongoing restoration of the Everglades ecosystem.

Geography
It is part of the Florida Heartland region.

U.S. Route 27 passes through the center of Clewiston, leading west then north  to Moore Haven, and southeast  to South Bay. Florida State Road 80 runs with US 27 through Clewiston but leads west  to LaBelle, the Hendry County seat.

Climate
Clewiston has a tropical savanna climate (Köppen: Aw).

Demographics

As of the census of 2000, there were 6,460 people, 2,174 households, and 1,632 families residing in the city. The racial makeup of the city was 75.79% White, 10.93% African American, 0.39% Native American, 1.18% Asian, 9.64% from other races, and 2.07% from two or more races. Hispanic or Latino of any race were 40.94% of the population.

There were 2,174 households, out of which 39.5% had children under the age of 18 living with them, 55.9% were married couples living together, 12.5% had a female householder with no husband present, and 24.9% were non-families. 18.9% of all households were made up of individuals, and 7.2% had someone living alone who was 65 years of age or older. The average household size was 2.93 and the average family size was 3.32.

In the city, the population was spread out, with 29.7% under the age of 18, 10.3% from 18 to 24, 28.3% from 25 to 44, 20.8% from 45 to 64, and 10.9% who were 65 years of age or older. The median age was 32 years. For every 100 females, there were 103.9 males. For every 100 females age 18 and over, there were 104.4 males.

The median income for a household in the city was $37,143, and the median income for a family was $38,652. Males had a median income of $31,139 versus $21,049 for females. The per capita income for the city was $15,527. About 14.8% of families and 18.8% of the population were below the poverty line, including 25.9% of those under age 18 and 7.1% of those age 65 or over.

In 2010 Clewiston had a population of 7,155. The racial and ethnic makeup of the population was 48.7% Hispanic or Latino, 35.2% non-Hispanic white, 12.7% black or African American, 0.8% Native American, 0.7% Asian Indian, 1.6% East/Southeast Asian, 0.2% non-Hispanic reporting some other race, and 2.9% reporting two or more races.

Education
The following are public schools located in the area, operated by Hendry County Schools:

Eastside Elementary
Westside Elementary
Central Elementary
Clewiston Middle School
Clewiston High School

Private schools:
Clewiston Christian School

There is a tribal school affiliated with the Bureau of Indian Education, Ahfachkee School, that has a Clewiston postal address but is outside the city limits, on the Big Cypress Reservation.

Libraries
The Hendry County Library Cooperative in Florida includes the Clewiston Library, Barron Library (located in LaBelle, the county seat) and the Harlem Library.

All three libraries provide Hendry County residents with materials and general information, and each library has a secondary individualized area of focus.  The Clewiston Library has a Florida room to house historical reference material and books pertinent to local and state history.  The Harlem Community Library is located in a former school building which also houses the Harlem Academy daycare center and its specialty is a growing African American collection. The Barron Library collects genealogical materials.

The Clewiston Library also recently sought and received an LSTA grant to digitize their local newspaper, The Clewiston News and have the digital versions added to the free, open access Florida Digital Newspaper Library.

Sites of interest
 Clewiston Inn
 Clewiston Museum
 Dixie Crystal Theatre
 Lake Okeechobee Scenic Trail (LOST)
 Tony's Mound

Notable people

 Steffon Bradford, professional basketball player
 Randy Dixon, football player
 Eric Green, football player
 Alfonso Marshall, football player
 Roland Martin, professional fisherman
 Quorey Payne, football player

See also
Executive House

References

 History of Clewiston, Florida

External links

 City of Clewiston official website
 Clewiston Public Library
 Clewiston Chamber of Commerce

Cities in Hendry County, Florida
Micropolitan areas of Florida
Populated places established in 1920
Cities in Florida
Populated places on Lake Okeechobee